Hoops Inc. were a short-lived Australian dance duo consisting of Steven Hooper and Simon Lewicki. They duo released two singles, before Lewicki formed Groove Terminator in 1996.

Discography

Singles

References

1995 establishments in Australia
1996 disestablishments in Australia
Musical groups established in 1995
Musical groups disestablished in 1996